Melon Day is an annual national holiday in  Turkmenistan devoted to festivities to celebrate the country's muskmelon, in particular a recent crossbreed product named "Turkmenbashy melon" (after Turkmenistan's first president), which is praised for its aroma, taste and massive size. It takes place on the second Sunday in August.

This holiday was established by  Turkmenistan’s then-President Saparmurat Niyazov in 1994, who preferred to be known as Turkmenbashy, or head of the Turkmen people. The day's celebrations feature a large display of the fruit in all its varieties, as well as a series of dance and music events, in the country's capital, Ashgabat.
 
In his address to farmers in 2004, President Niyazov said: "Almighty God has turned Turkmen soil into a fertile source of an abundance of the tastiest fruits. Among them are Turkmen melons, which are the result of farmers' hard work and which have a unique taste reminiscent of the fruit of paradise." In newspapers Niyazov was quoted as saying, "The Turkmen melon is the source of our pride. Its taste has no equals in the world, the smell makes your head spin."

Melon Day is among 24 public holidays of Turkmenistan – typical titles of which are Drop of Water is a Grain of Gold Festival, Festival of the Poetry of Magtymguli, Good Neighborliness Day, Race Horse Day, and Carpet Day.

See also
Public holidays in Turkmenistan

References

External links
Niyazov's address on the occasion of the Turkmen Melon Day
Turkmen leader inspires devotion to melon BBC, August 11, 2003.
Turkmenistan celebrates 'Melon Day' UPI, August 11, 2002.
Turkmenistan celebrates Melon Day Al Jazeera, August 23, 2005.

Public holidays in Turkmenistan
National holidays
Melons
August observances
Holidays and observances by scheduling (nth weekday of the month)
Observances about food and drink
Sunday observances